

News

January
2 – Bruno Risi and Franco Marvulli win the 2007 Six Days of Zürich with a total of 394 points, having 37 points advantage in favour of Robert Bartko and Iljo Keisse. The rest of the pack was one or more laps behind. cyclingnews.com
18 – Peter Schep returns into the sport after recovering from his injury. He will be able to defend his world title in Mallorca. telesport.nl

World championships

World Cup Classics

Continental championships

Asian championships

European championships

National championships
 2007 Dutch National Track Championships
 French National Track Championships
 Australian National Track Championships
 British National Track Championships
 United States National Track Championships

Pan American Games

Southeast Asian Games

Six-day events
The 2007 Six days track cycling events are multi-race competitions, each taking place over six days at various locations in mainland Europe. The riders challenge each other in track cycling disciplines including the madison, track time trials, sprints, and Derny motor-paced races.

The competitions are organised by the UCI.

UIV Cup

Sprint events

See also
2007 in women's road cycling
2007 in men's road cycling
2007 in sports
2008 in track cycling

 
Track cycling by year